The Territorial Prelature of Marajó is a Roman Catholic territorial prelature located in the city of Marajó in the Ecclesiastical province of Belém do Pará in Brazil.

History
On April 14, 1928, the Territorial Prelature of Marajó was established from the Metropolitan Archdiocese of Belém do Pará.

Leadership
 Evaristo Pascoal Spengler (June 1, 2016 – present)
 José Luís Azcona Hermoso, O.A.R. (July 6, 1988 – June 1, 2016)
 Alquilio Alvarez Diez, O.A.R. (May 6, 1965 - November 3, 1985)
 Gregório Alonso Aparicio, O.A.R. (January 9, 1943 - April 4, 1965)

References
 GCatholic.org
 Catholic Hierarchy

Roman Catholic dioceses in Brazil
Christian organizations established in 1928
Marajó, Roman Catholic Territorial Prelature of
Roman Catholic dioceses and prelatures established in the 20th century
Territorial prelatures